Hırka is a village in the Tavas District of Denizli Province in Turkey. As of 2012, the village has a population of 377.

References

Villages in Tavas District